The Battle of Yerbal, also known as the Battle of Erval or Battle of Pedras Altas, was fought on 25 May 1827 between a militia force of the Imperial Brazilian Army and an Argentine cavalry detachment in the context of the Cisplatine War.

Battle 
Lieutenant-colonel Bonifácio Isás Calderón, leading 400 militiamen, confronted an 891 men strong Argentine cavalry detachment in the vicinity of Pedras Altas. The Argentine commander, Juan Lavalle, decided to flee and was pursued until the night. Lavalle and captain Maciel, his second in command, were wounded while charging against the Brazilians.

References

Bibliography 
 
 
 

Conflicts in 1827
Yerbal
Yerbal
Battles of the Cisplatine War
1827 in Brazil
May 1827 events